Dunbaria is a genus of flowering plants in the legume family, Fabaceae. It belongs to the subfamily Faboideae.

Uses
Root tubers of Dunbaria species have been used as traditional food for Aborigines of the Northern Territory.

Species 
 Dunbaria bella
 Dunbaria circinalis
 Dunbaria cumingiana
 Dunbaria debilis
 Dunbaria ferruginea
 Dunbaria flavescens
 Dunbaria floresiana
 Dunbaria fusca
 Dunbaria glabra
 Dunbaria glandulosa
 Dunbaria gracilipes
 Dunbaria henryi
 Dunbaria lecomtei
 Dunbaria longiracemosa
 Dunbaria nivea
 Dunbaria parvifolia
 Dunbaria podocarpa
 Dunbaria punctata
 Dunbaria rubella
 Dunbaria thorelii
 Dunbaria truncata
 Dunbaria villosa

References

External links 

 

Phaseoleae
Fabaceae genera